Damville may refer to:

Persons 
 Charles de Montmorency-Damville (1537–1612), duke of Damville, admiral of France, peer of France
 Henri I de Montmorency-Damville (1534–1614), Marshal of France, Constable of France, seigneur of Damville, served as Governor of Languedoc from 1563 to 1614

Places

Canada 
 Damville Lake, a body of water in the unorganized territory of Rivière-Mistassini, Maria-Chapdelaine Regional County Municipality, Saguenay–Lac-Saint-Jean, in Quebec
 Damville (Quebec township), a township in the unorganized territory of Rivière-Mistassini, Quebec

France 
 Buis-sur-Damville, a former commune in the department of Eure, Normandy
 Damville, Eure, a former commune in the department of Eure, Normandy

See also
Danville (disambiguation)